Benjamin Dy (September 22, 1952 - February 16, 2013) is a Filipino politician and a former Governor of Isabela. Dy was a member of the Dy political clan, whose members have held various elective posts in the province since the 1960s.

Early life
Benjamin G. Dy, Sr. was born in Cauayan, Isabela on September 22, 1952. The eldest among the children of the late political patriarch Faustino Dy, Sr. and Natividad Guzman-Dy, the mayor was known to be the most low-profile among the Dy siblings.

Family

Personal life
Benjamin Dy is survived by wife Cecilia M. Dy and 17 children: 
Benjamin Dy, Jr.
Maria Carmina Natividad Dy 
Bryan Ferdinand Dy 
Bernard Faustino Dy
Benjamin "Carlo" Dy
Bien Francis Dy 
Cheyene Dy 
Fermarc Dy 
Benjamin Dy III 
Kaye Isabella Dy
Benjamin Victor IV 
Tara Dy 
Benjamin "Isabelo" Dy V 
Benjamin "Charles" Dy VI
Jamine Yssa Dy
Selene Isabelle Dy 
Benedict Dy

Relatives 
Several of Dy's relatives became prominent public figures in their own right:
Faustino N. Dy, Sr. patriarch of the family, is the father of the former governor. He was Governor (1970–1992) and Mayor (1965–1969) of the province of Isabela
Faustino G. Dy, Jr. is brother of former governor. He is a former Representative of the 2nd District of Isabela from 1992 to 2001 before becoming a Governor himself from 2001 to 2004 (he was defeated in the 2004 elections by Grace Padaca)
Faustino Dy III is brother of the former governor. He is a former Representative of the 2nd District of Isabela in the 14th Philippine Congress, served as Mayor of the City of Cauayan, Isabela from 1992 to 2001, and as Representative of the same District to the 12th and 13th Philippine Congress (2001–2007) and Governor of Isabela (2010–2019)
Caesar G. Dy is brother of former governor. He is a former Mayor of the City of Cauayan, Isabela (2001–2010)
Napoleon S. Dy, is brother of former governor. He is a former Mayor of the municipality of Alicia (2001–2010), and incumbent Representative (Congressman) of 3rd District of Province of Isabela (2010–Present)
Victor G. Dy, is brother of former governor. He is a former Barangay captain of San Fermin, Cauayan, Isabela (2001–2004) 
Arlene Dy-Maranan is sister of former governor 
Eloisa Dy-Valle is sister of former governor

Political life
Mayor Benjamin Dy, who served as Isabela governor from 1992 to 2001. Dy was supposed to run as Cauayan mayor in the 2013 midterm elections, but his son Bernard had to replace him in December because of his ailment.

Death
Ben Dy died on February 16, 2013, due to complications from recurring emphysema at St. Luke’s Medical Center in Metro Manila on Saturday, a close aide said.

Ben Dy, 60, had been suffering from emphysema for years and died in the hospital at 1:30 a.m. Saturday, said Nestor de Villa, general services officer of Cauayan.

Relatives said a wake has been set for three nights at Heritage Memorial Park in Taguig before Dy’s remains will be taken here.

A wake was held at the Isabela provincial capitol on the night of February 19, 2013 and at Cauayan City Hall.

References

1952 births
2013 deaths
Governors of Isabela (province)
Mayors of places in Isabela (province)
Deaths from lung cancer in the Philippines
Deaths from emphysema
Nationalist People's Coalition politicians
People from Isabela (province)